Larissa Anderson is an American softball coach who is the current head coach at Missouri.

Coaching career

Hofstra
Anderson was hired as Hofstra's head coach in 2014 replacing longtime head coach, Bill Edwards.

Missouri
On May 26, 2018, Larissa Anderson was announced as the new head coach of the Missouri softball program, replacing Ehren Earleywine who was fired before the 2018 season.

Head coaching record

College

References

Living people
Female sports coaches
American softball coaches
Gannon Golden Knights softball players
Gannon Golden Knights softball coaches
Hofstra Pride softball coaches
Missouri Tigers softball coaches
Year of birth missing (living people)